Aldover is a municipality in the comarca of Baix Ebre, in the province of Tarragona, in Catalonia, Spain.

There was a RENFE railway line from Tortosa to Alcañiz and Zaragoza that used to pass through this town until 1973. This line was dismantled as a result of a 1962 World Bank report advising the Spanish State to concentrate investment in the great lines and to abandon the less profitable railways connecting rural areas. Since the line was terminated, the rails were pulled off and the Aldover train station buildings lie abandoned.

References

External links 

 Pàgina web de l'Ajuntament 
 Government data pages 

Municipalities in Baix Ebre
Populated places in Baix Ebre